Lost Girl is a Canadian supernatural drama television series  that premiered on Showcase on September 12, 2010. The series was created by Michelle Lovretta and is produced by Jay Firestone and Prodigy Pictures Inc., with the participation of the Canadian Television Fund (Canada Media Fund), and in association with Shaw Media. It follows the life of a bisexual succubus named Bo, played by Anna Silk, as she learns to control her superhuman abilities, help those in need, and discover the truth about her origins.

On November 12, 2010, Showcase renewed Lost Girl for a second season, announcing "record-breaking ratings" and the "number one scripted series for Adults 25-54 across all specialty channels" in Canada.  On July 7, 2011, Showcase announced that the Season Two premiere would be on September 4, 2011, and that an additional nine episodes had been ordered to make the season a total of 22 episodes.

In the United Kingdom and Ireland, Season Two premiered on Syfy (UK) on January 12, 2012.  In Australia, Season Two premiered on Sci Fi on February 23, 2012.  In the United States, Season Two premiered on Syfy on April 16, 2012; one week after the end of Season One.

Plot

Bo faces personal challenges with Dyson after she found out in Blood Lines that he had lied to her about knowing who her birth mother was and that he had been Trick's undercover agent, then later about his lost feelings of passion for her; and with Lauren when their  relationship becomes complicated after The Morrigan informed Bo in "It's Better to Burn Out Than Fae Away" that Lauren had a girlfriend. At the same time that she is coping with these turmoils, a villainous and evil ancient enemy of the Fae, the Garuda, is awakened and reappears with the intent to destroy the truce between Light and Dark Fae, and reignite the Great War between them. The new Ash, Lachlan, recruits Bo to be his champion in the battle against the Garuda and she agrees on the condition that he regard her as a partner, not as his servant. Bo learns in Into the Dark that she is not only Trick's maternal granddaughter, but deduces that she has inherited some of his Blood Sage powers: if her blood comes into contact with someone's open wound, it can enslave and bind the recipient to her will (the same power that her mother, Aife, used to create male slaves). She uses her blood power to unite her team in the final battle against the Garuda.

Cast and characters

Main cast 
 Anna Silk  as Bo
 Kris Holden-Ried  as Dyson
 Ksenia Solo  as Kenzi
 Zoie Palmer  as Dr. Lauren Lewis
 Rick Howland  as Fitzpatrick "Trick" McCorrigan
 K. C. Collins  as Hale Santiago

Recurring cast
 Emmanuelle Vaugier as Evony Fleurette Marquise: The Morrigan.
 Paul Amos as Vex: a Mesmer.
 Kate Trotter as The Norn.
 Vincent Walsh as Lachlan: The Ash, a Naga
 Lina Roessler as Ciara: a Fairy-Scuffock hybrid.
 Anthony Lemke as Ryan Lambert: a Dark Fae.
 Hayley Nault as the Nain Rouge: a divine Fae spirit.
 Raoul Trujillo as The Garuda: an ancient and fiendish powerful enemy of the Fae.
 Athena Karkanis as Nadia: Lauren's human girlfriend.
 Aaron Ashmore as Nate: Kenzi's boyfriend.

Production
Showcase renewed Lost Girl for a second season on November 12, 2010, announcing "record-breaking ratings" and the "number one scripted series for Adults 25-54 across all specialty channels" in Canada.

Production on thirteen episodes for Season Two began on May 17, 2011, with filming taking place at a Toronto soundstage and at locations in and around the city until September 22, for a targeted Fall 2011 premiere.

On May 18, 2011, Syfy (U.S.) announced that it had acquired 26 episodes (Season One and Season Two) of Lost Girl from Prodigy Pictures.

Showcase announced in a July 7, 2011, press release that the Season Two premiere  would be on September 4, 2011, and that an additional nine episodes had been ordered to make the season a total of 22 episodes.  The order for more episodes was made public two weeks before the first appearance of Lost Girl cast and producers at San Diego Comic-Con International 2011.

On December 12, 2011, Syfy announced the United States debut of Lost Girl on January 16, 2012. Season Two premiered on April 16, 2012 (one week after the finale episode of Season One).

Broadcast special
The finale of Season Two on April 1, 2012, was preceded by the Showcase special, Lost Girl Finale Pre-Show. Filmed on the series' "Dal Riata" set, the live audience one-hour program hosted by Lost Girl writer Steve Cochrane featured behind-the-scenes footage and interviews with Anna Silk, Kris Holden-Ried, Ksenia Solo, Zoie Palmer, Rick Howland, K.C. Collins, Paul Amos, and executive producer Jay Firestone.

Episodes

Notes

Reception and popularity
In Season Two, the decision to cut eight seconds of an emotive scene between Bo and Lauren from "Scream a Little Dream" created controversy among LGBT fans of the show, resulting in the network being accused of insensitivity and censorship. Lost Girl producers responded to the backlash by issuing a public statement on the show's Facebook page explaining that the edits were done in-house, and not by Syfy, for "timing and not content."  As noted by Dorothy Snarker writing for AfterEllen: "With so little representation of gay relationships on TV, every little touch matters."  After this experience, beginning with Season Three, the traditional opening credits accompanied by the Lost Girl Theme song were replaced with all opening credits superimposed over footage of the first scene, sparing  00:30 seconds from being edited out of the episodes for Syfy (U.S.).

In a 2012 report by TiVo of television programs watched at bedtime, Lost Girl was rated one of the top ten, most watched shows.

In a Slate magazine 2012 year-end list of 15 favorite television shows that are a pleasure to watch, Lost Girl (on Syfy) was named "Number 1" on the list, and hailed as "Sexy, snarky, and Canadian."

Home media release
On November 13, 2012, Berkshire Axis Media released Season Two in Canada on DVD and Blu-ray.  In the United States (Region 1), Giant Ape Media (Funimation SC) released the Season 2 uncut episodes "not seen on Syfy" on DVD and Blu-ray on November 13, 2012.  In the United Kingdom and Ireland (Region 2), Sony Pictures Home Entertainment released the DVD of Season 2 on September 9, 2013.  In Australia, Universal Sony Pictures released Season Two on September 19, 2013.

Awards and nominations

Canadian Screen Awards

Leo Awards

WorldFest-Houston International Film Festival

References

External links
 
 Lost Girl at  Syfy (U.S.) 
  Lost Girl at Prodigy Pictures Inc.  
 Lost Girl at Canadian Television Fund  
 
 
 Lost Girl list of episodes at Garn's Guides
 Lost Girl at BO SERIES INC. (Giant Ape Media)

Season
2011 Canadian television seasons
2012 Canadian television seasons